was a town located in Kume District, Okayama Prefecture, Japan.

As of 2003, the town had an estimated population of 7,188 and a density of 99.72 persons per km2. The total area was 72.08 km2.

On March 22, 2005, Chūō, along with the towns of Asahi and Yanahara (all from Kume District), was merged to create the town of Misaki.

Dissolved municipalities of Okayama Prefecture